In Our Village (Romanian: În sat la noi) is a 1951 Romanian drama film directed by Jean Georgescu and Victor Iliu.

The film's sets were designed by Stefan Norris.

Cast
  Constantin Ramadan as Ion Lepadat  
 George Manu as Ionica Lepadat  
 Nana Ianculescu as Maria  
 Aurel Ghitescu as Ilie Scapau  
 Andrei Codarcea  as The Farmhand Mihaila  
 Vasile Lazarescu as Pantelimon  
 Valentina Cios as Leana  
 Ludovic Antal as Avram  
 Natalia Arsene  as Floarea  
 Cezar Rovintescu  
 Gheorghe Soare as Ifrim  
 Nicolae Fagadaru as Ristea  
 Constantin Posa  
 Nick Niculescu 
 Alexandru Alger  
 Niculae Scorteanu  
 Liviu Ciulei as Dumitru  
 Gheorghe Nicolescu 
 Paul Zbrentea as Eftimie  
 Ilariu Popescu 
 Nucu Paunescu as Sarbu Iacov  
 Marietta Rares as Ion Lepadat's Wife  
 Nelly Dordea  as Safta  
 Puica Stanescu  as Ana  
 Jeannette Dumitrescu  
 Doina Tutescu 
 Ana Barcan 
 Constantin Vintila

References

Bibliography 
 Liehm, Mira & Liehm, Antonín J. The Most Important Art: Eastern European Film After 1945. University of California Press, 1977.

External links 
 

1951 films
1951 drama films
Romanian drama films
1950s Romanian-language films
Films directed by Victor Iliu
Romanian black-and-white films